Stephan Haggard is the Lawrence and Sallye Krause Professor of Korea-Pacific Studies at the School of Global Policy and Strategy and distinguished professor of political scientist specializing in comparative politics at the University of California San Diego. He received his Ph.D. from the University of California Berkeley (1983) and taught in the Government Department at Harvard (1983-1992) before joining the faculty at UC San Diego. He teaches courses on international political economy, the international relations of the Asia-Pacific and qualitative methods. He is currently the editor of the Journal of East Asian Studies, a journal devoted to publishing innovative social science research on the region.

Research
Haggard’s research lies at the intersection of international relations, international political economy and comparative politics. He has a particular interest in East Asia and the Korean peninsula.

The Political Economy of Growth

Haggard's first book, Pathways from the Periphery: The Political Economy of Growth (1990) took a statist approach to the growth of the East Asian newly industrializing countries, comparing their development experiences with those of Latin America. He revisited these themes in his 2018 book on Developmental States. His early work also addressed issues of the political economy of financial crises, reform and structural adjustment, most notably in his initial collaboration with Robert Kaufman The Politics of Adjustment: International Constraints, Distributive Politics, and the State (1992) and Haggard and Steven Webb, eds. Voting for Reform: The Political Economy Adjustment in New Democracies (1994). In 2000, he published an analysis of the East Asian financial crisis of 1997-1998 titled The Political Economy of the Asian Financial Crisis.

Transitions to and from Democratic Rule and Their Consequences

From the mid-1990s, Haggard and Kaufman turned their attention to transition to and from democratic rule. Their work in this vein included The Political Economy of Democratic Transitions (1995), Development, Democracy and Welfare States: Latin America, East Asia, and Eastern Europe (2008) — one of the first books to compare welfare regimes across the developing world - and "Inequality and Regime Change; Democratic Transitions and the Stability of Democratic Rule" (American Political Science Review 2012). The last piece was elaborated in Dictators and Democrats: Elites, Masses and Regime Change (2016).

North Korea

In the mid-2000s, Haggard began a collaboration with Marcus Noland on the political economy of North Korea. In addition to numerous articles on the topic, they produce three monographs: Famine in North Korea: Markets, Aid, and Reform (2007); Witness to Transformation: Refugee Insights into North Korea (2011) and Hard Target: Sanctions, Inducements and the Case of North Korea (2017). He and Noland have maintained the "North Korea: Witness to Transformation" blog, which covers humanitarian, human rights, political and strategic developments around the Korean peninsula.

Education
Haggard received a B.A. in political science in 1976 and a M.A. in 1977 from UC Berkeley. In 1983, he obtained a Ph.D. in political science from UC Berkeley, writing his dissertation under the direction of Ernst B. Haas.

Personal life
Haggard is married to Sharon Crasnow, a philosopher of social science, and has two children: Kit and Max. He served in the United States Army (1972–74).

Works

References

External links

University of California, Berkeley alumni
University of California, San Diego faculty
American political scientists
Living people
Year of birth missing (living people)
Koreanists